Marion Tietz (born 17 November 1952) is a former East German handball player who competed in the 1976 Summer Olympics and in the 1980 Summer Olympics.

In 1976 she won the silver medal with the East German team. She played all five matches and scored fourteen goals.

Four years later she won the bronze medal as a member of the East German. She played all five matches and scored three goals.

External links
profile

1952 births
Living people
German female handball players
Handball players at the 1976 Summer Olympics
Handball players at the 1980 Summer Olympics
Olympic handball players of East Germany
Olympic silver medalists for East Germany
Olympic bronze medalists for East Germany
Olympic medalists in handball
Medalists at the 1980 Summer Olympics
Medalists at the 1976 Summer Olympics